International Center on Deafness and the Arts (ICODA) is a non-profit organization based in Northbrook, Illinois, US. Patricia Scherer is the founder and president. Founded in 1973, the organization is a registered nonprofit, tax exempt, 501(c)(3) corporation.

History
The Center on Deafness was founded in 1973 by Patricia Scherer, and became the International Center On Deafness and the Arts in July 1997.

ICODA Programs
CenterLight Family Theatre performs using American Sign Language and Spoken English concurrently during the performance.

Story-N-Sign Touring Theatre was created in 1995. Performers who are Deaf, Hard of Hearing, and Hearing perform short stories, poems and mimes in American Sign Language and Spoken English.

Icodance is a dance company whose dancers are Deaf, Hard of Hearing and Hearing.

Traveling Hands Troupe (THT) serves as an outreach program for ICODance Company.  The program's members are deaf, hard of hearing, and hearing persons between the ages of 7 and 18.  The troupe performs poems, interpreted song and dance for various service organizations.

I.O.I Program - In 1994 a partnership between Illinois State University, Oakton Community College & ICODA was established for the primary purpose of training teachers of the deaf and hard of hearing in the Chicago area.

Museum on Deafness at ICODA is a permanent exhibit on deafness and hearing loss.

Awards
Best New Freedom Community Program, Northbrook Arts Commission, 1993
Speech & Hearing Foundation Lifetime Achievement Award, Northwestern University, 1994
Presidents Award, Boulevard Art Center, 1994
Best Ensemble Award for Godspell, Chicago After Dark Theater Awards, 1996
Village of Northbrook established "Recognize ICODA Day in Northbrook", 1998
Omni Youth Services, Outstanding Recognition, 2000

See also
Marlee Matlin

References

External links
ICODA homepage

Deafness arts organizations
Deaf culture
Deaf artists
Disability organizations based in the United States
Disability theatre